The Arizona State Legislature is the state legislature of the U.S. state of Arizona. It is a bicameral legislature that consists of a lower house, the House of Representatives, and an upper house, the Senate. Composed of 90 legislators, the state legislature meets in the Capitol Complex in the state capital of Phoenix, Arizona. Created by the Arizona Constitution upon statehood in 1912, the Arizona State Legislature met biennially until 1950. Today, they meet annually.

Arizona's electoral districts are different from those in most U.S. states. The state is divided into 30 legislative districts, each of which elects one senator and two representatives. Legislators are term limited to eight consecutive years in office, but can run again after two years or run for a seat in the other house.

History

Pre-statehood
Congress formed the New Mexico Territory in 1850 consisting of the land that is now Arizona north of the Gila River, along with what is now New Mexico, parts of Colorado and Nevada. In 1853, the territory expanded under the Gadsden Purchase agreement by nearly 30,000 square miles of land south of the Gila River in Arizona, forming the state’s current boundary with Mexico. In 1863, President Abraham Lincoln signed the Arizona Organic Act creating the Territory of Arizona. In 1864, the First Territorial Legislature convened in Prescott, the territory’s first capital. The capital moved from Prescott to Tucson and back to Prescott before being permanently established in Phoenix in 1889.

Early years of statehood
On June 20, 1910, President William Howard Taft signed the Enabling Act, allowing the Arizona Territory to hold a constitutional convention. Elected Arizona delegates convened in Phoenix at the territorial capitol on October 10, 1910, to draft the Arizona Constitution. Although constitutional provisions for prohibition and women’s suffrage were rejected, voters added both within three years of statehood. The new constitution was ratified by voters on February 9, 1911, and Arizona statehood took place on February 14, 1912, after eliminating a provision to recall judges that caused an initial veto by President Taft. A few months later, illustrating Arizona's independent streak, voters reinstated the provision permitting the recall of judges.

Arizona's First Legislature had 19 state senators and 35 state representatives and convened March 18, 1912. The Legislature met on a biennial basis until 1950, when a constitutional amendment provided for annual sessions.

Legislative process
The Arizona Legislature is responsible for making laws in the state of Arizona. The first step in the legislative process is bill drafting. First, legislators must submit a bill request to the legislative council staff. Additionally, a legislator-elect may submit a bill request or private citizens can obtain authorization from a legislator to use the legislator's name before giving instructions to the legislative council staff. The legislative council staff delivers a bill draft to the sponsor or requester and if directed, will prepare the bill for introduction.

Bills undergo three or four readings during the legislative process. After the first reading, they are assigned to committee. Committees can amend measures or hold legislation and prevent it from advancing. Once committee action is completed, the bill undergoes a second hearing and a third hearing, which happens just before the floor vote on it. The bill is then sent to the opposite legislative house for consideration. If approved, without amendment, it is sent to the governor. If there is amendment, however, the first legislative house may either reconsider the bill with amendments or ask for the establishment of a conference committee to work out differences in the versions of the bill passed by each chamber. Once a piece of legislation approved by both houses is forwarded to the governor, it may either be signed or vetoed. If it is signed, it takes effect on the effective date of the legislation. If it is vetoed, lawmakers may override the veto with a vote by a two-thirds majority in both chambers.

Alternatively, instead of presenting the measure to the Governor, the Legislature may order that it be submitted to the people. If the measure is approved by the people, the Governor has no power to veto it, and the Legislature may not repeal it, and may not amend it unless the amending legislation furthers the purposes of such measure and at least three-fourths of the members of each house of the Legislature, by a roll call of ayes and nays, vote to amend such measure.

Membership

Districting
There are 30 legislative districts in Arizona, each of which is a multi-member constituency.  Each district elects a state senator and two state representatives for a two-year term. The combining of upper and lower house districts into a single constituency is known as nesting and is found in only seven U.S. state legislatures: Arizona, Idaho, Maryland, New Jersey, North Dakota, South Dakota, and Washington.

Term limits
Under article 4, part 2, section 21 of the Constitution of Arizona, members of the Arizona Legislature serve two-year terms, and legislators are subject to term limits. Members may only serve four consecutive terms (or eight years) in each house; however, once serving the limit, former members are re-eligible for election after a 2-year respite. Members who are term-limited in one house frequently seek election to other positions within the state.

Party composition and elections

Party division of the legislature since the 1996 Elections:

References

External links

Official Arizona State Legislature website

Arizona House of Representatives website
House member rosters
Arizona State Senate website
Senate member rosters

 
Legislature
Bicameral legislatures